Carathis septentrionalis is a moth of the family Erebidae first described by Vitor Osmar Becker in 2011. It is found in Costa Rica.

References

Moths described in 2011
Phaegopterina
Moths of Central America